Michael Trapp  (born July 10, 1988) is an American snowboarder.
 
He competed in the 2011, 2013, 2015 and 2017 FIS Snowboard World Championships, and in the 2018 Winter Olympics, in parallel giant slalom.

References

External links

1988 births
Living people
American male snowboarders 
Olympic snowboarders of the United States 
Snowboarders at the 2018 Winter Olympics 
20th-century American people
21st-century American people